The Saguache Crescent (pronounced ) is a weekly newspaper published in Saguache, Colorado, notable for continuing to use a Linotype to produce each issue long after most newspapers have adopted  electronic production methods.

Founding
The initial newspaper was started by Otto Mears, who arrived in Saguache  in 1867. The site had been long known to Native Americans and Spanish shepherds, but the discovery of gold and silver in the nearby mountains—the Sangre de Cristo Range to the east and the San Juan Mountains to the west—brought a flood of new settlers to the area.  Mears recognized the need for a reliable source of food and other essentials, and he constructed a threshing machine and a grist mill for threshing and grinding wheat to make flour for Saguache and the surrounding mining camps.  Soon Saguache became a booming supply town, and in 1874 Mears published its first newspaper, The Saguache Chronicle, to attract new pioneers to the area.  Following several name changes, the paper took its present name, The Saguache Crescent.

Present day

Publisher Dean Coombs is the paper's entire staff. The Saguache Crescent was purchased by the Coombs family  in 1917, and it has been in the family for three generations. It still uses a 1921 linotype machine to set the print, and a 1921 printing press. It features a decorative masthead, no photos, sells for 35 cents a copy, and publishes "all the good news fit to print"; Coombs refuses to print bad news.  He says that his mother set that policy and it is non-negotiable.

The only task that Coombs does not handle himself is that of reporter; Saguache residents bring the news to him: "If you bring it, and it's not just absolute insanity, and you want to sign your name to it, then I'll generally print it" he says.  Coombs must function as repairman as well; as old machines come up for sale he buys them to keep on hand for spare parts.

Saguache is the Saguache County seat and the Crescent is the official newspaper of record for Saguache County.  With only about 550 residents, the paper does not generate much income from commercial advertising; Coombs says that income from the county's paid legal notices is all that keeps the paper afloat.

In 2013, newspaper historian Michael S. Sweeney, a professor in the E. W. Scripps School of Journalism, said he knew of no other newspaper still using linotype. CBS News Sunday Morning a visited to The Saguache Crescent in 2014. Coombs said the Crescent was the only newspaper in the U.S., and perhaps even the world, still using Linotype. However, a weekly newspaper based in Vervins, France, continues to use a Linotype as part of its production.

The Saguache Crescent is still active . Coombs says that he is not training anyone to take over the paper, so his retirement will be the end of an era.

Notes

References

1867 establishments in Colorado Territory
Newspapers published in Colorado
Newspapers established in 1867
Weekly newspapers published in the United States